Bolshiye Ivanovskiye is a rural locality (a village) in Vorobyovskoye Rural Settlement, Sokolsky District, Vologda Oblast, Russia. The population was 27 as of 2002.

Geography 
The distance to Sokol is 61 km, to Vorobyovo is 5 km. Bolshaya is the nearest rural locality.

References 

Rural localities in Sokolsky District, Vologda Oblast